Ivan Dodig and Austin Krajicek defeated Rohan Bopanna and Matthew Ebden in the final, 7–6(7–5), 2–6, [12–10] to win the doubles tennis title at the 2023 Rotterdam Open. The pair saved a champiomship point en route to the title.

Robin Haase and Matwé Middelkoop were the defending champions, but lost in the first round to Santiago González and Édouard Roger-Vasselin. 

Wesley Koolhof and Neal Skupski will lose the joint ATP No. 1 doubles ranking at the end of the tournament, as a result of their first-round loss.

Seeds

Draw

Draw

Qualifying

Seeds

Qualifiers
  Sander Gillé /  Joran Vliegen

Qualifying draw

References

External links
 Main draw
 Qualifying draw

2023 ATP Tour